Uttama Villain is a 2015 Indian Tamil-language comedy drama film directed by Ramesh Aravind and written by Kamal Haasan. The film was presented by N. Lingusamy in association with Kamal Haasan and produced by S. Chandrahasan for Raaj Kamal Films International and N. Subash Chandrabose for Thirupathi Brothers Film Media. It features an ensemble cast that includes Kamal Hassan, K. Viswanath, K. Balachander, Jayaram, Andrea Jeremiah, Pooja Kumar, Nassar, Parvathy Thiruvothu and Urvashi in prominent roles. This is the posthumous film of actor and director, K. Balachander following his death in December 2014.

It follows Superstar Manoranjan (Kamal Haasan), who is affected by brain tumour, learns that he has only a short time to live and approaches his mentor, director Margadarisi (K. Balachander) to direct his next project — a folklore-ish comedy about a man who keeps cheating death and his role in saving a kingdom. Meanwhile, he has to sort out his personal life, which involves an estranged son, and a daughter from the love of his life.

The project was materialised in late 2013, and the film's principal photography commenced on 3 March 2014. Filming which took place in Chennai, Bengaluru and Turkey was completed on 9 August 2014. The cinematography was handled by Shamdat and Vijay Shankar did the editing work. The music is composed by Ghibran, in his first collaboration with Kamal Haasan, the soundtrack album received high praise upon its release.

Uttama Villain, after many delays, was scheduled to release on 1 May 2015, but was released a day later, after the disputes between financiers and producers were sorted out. The film received outstanding reviews from critics. While it performed well overseas, it underperformed at the Indian box-office. Despite the fact that it became a commercial failure, the film received several awards from International Film Festivals.

Plot 
Manoranjan is a leading film star who is immensely popular among his fans but is beset with several personal problems. Twenty five years ago, he had been forced to marry Varalakshmi, the daughter of noted film director Poornachandra Rao, despite being in a relationship with a woman named Yamini (not shown on-screen). His relationship with his son with Varalakshmi, Manohar, is troubled. Besides, he comes to realise that he has a daughter Manonmani, who was born out of wedlock, during his relationship with Yamini, and was raised by Yamini's husband Jacob Zachariah, after Yamini's death. Furthermore, he is recently diagnosed with advanced stage brain cancer and has only a few more months to live, a fact which is unknown to his own family. He is treated by his family doctor Dr. Arpana, with whom he has an extramarital affair.

After these revelations come to him in a flood, Manoranjan decides to withdraw from a film produced by Poornachandra Rao and instead act in a film produced by himself and directed by Margadarsi, who was his mentor. The two directors had fallen out when Manoranjan married Varalakshmi and started acting in films directed and produced by Poornachandra Rao, who is Margadarsi's rival. Despite the personal differences between the directors, Manoranjan wishes for Margadarsi to be the director of his last film before he dies. Margadarsi initially refuses to direct Manoranjan, but when he hears from Arpana about Manoranjan's terminal illness, he is visibly moved and accepts to direct Manoranjan. When Poornachandra Rao and Varalakshmi find out about Manoranjan's plan, they become enraged and leave his house along with Manohar. Undaunted, Manoranjan proceeds with his film.

Manoranjan's film with Margadarsi is titled Uttama Villain. It is a fantasy comedy film which tells the story of a street artist named Uttaman, who has dodged death several times and is hence believed to be immortal. With the help of a princess named Karpagavalli, he works to defeat the evil king Muttharasan, who is obsessed about gaining Karpagavalli and the whole Theeyam empire. During the shooting of the film, Manoranjan's condition worsens, and he is hospitalised several times. Margadarsi convinces Manoranjan to inform his family about his condition. This leads to his rapprochement with Poornachandra Rao (and also between Margadarsi and Poornachandra Rao) and the growth of a bond with his son Manohar. Varalakshmi, on the other hand, suffers a heart attack on hearing the news, though she soon recovers. She apologises to Manoranjan for her actions to forcibly separate him from Yamini, so that she could marry him. Later, Manoranjan finds out that a letter he had written to Yamini shortly after they had separated, had not been delivered to her. When Manonmani reads this letter, which tells about Manoranjan's support for Yamini's decision to not undergo an abortion despite being pregnant out of wedlock, her hatred towards her biological father turns to love and she finally accepts him as her father.

After completing the shooting of Uttama Villain, Manoranjan becomes very sick, suffering from delirium as well as slurred speech and movement, and faints. He is immediately rushed to the hospital. Margadarsi completes editing the film and plays it in the hospital. The people present in the hospital, including all the loved ones of Manoranjan, enjoy the film, which ends with Uttaman killing Muttharasan in a stage drama (Iraniya Naadagam), thus dodging death yet again. However, in real life, Arpana informs Manohar and Manonmani that Manoranjan had died.

The film ends with a screening of Uttama Villain in a theatre, which is enjoyed by the audience and becomes a hit.

Cast 

 Kamal Haasan as Manoranjan, a popular actor in Tamil Nadu (plays Uthaman)
 K. Balachander as Margadarisi, reputed film director and Manoranjan's guru
 K. Viswanath as Poornachandra Rao, Manoranjan's father-in-law
 Jayaram as Jacob Zachariah, Yamini's husband
 Urvashi as Varalakshmi
 Andrea Jeremiah as Dr Arpana
 Pooja Kumar as Parveen (Karpagavalli)
 Parvathy Thiruvothu as Manonmani/Yamini (seen in photos)
 Nassar as Nassar, an actor (plays Muttharasan)
 Shanmugarajan as Shanmugarajan (plays Sudalaimuthu)
 M. S. Bhaskar as Chokkalingam Chettiar (Chokku), Manoranjan's personal assistant
 G. Gnanasambandam as Kaakapusundar
 Vaiyapuri as Snake charmer
 Chitra Lakshmanan as PRO Lakshmanan
 Ajay Rathnam as King Sadayavarman
 Dheepa Ramanujam as Queen
 Ashwin Arvind as Manohar, Manoranjan's son
 Parvathy Nair as Indira
 Ajay Raj as Parthi
 Bhargavi Narayan as Dhanalakshmi
 Prakash Belawadi as Dr. D. S. (Neurosurgeon) (cameo appearance)

Ghibran, Subbu Arumugam, Shamdat and Vijai Shankar make cameo appearances as themselves, working as technicians on the film in the film. Rajesh M. Selva, the first assistant director, appears as a spy in the film.

Production

Development 
In early 2013, director-producer N. Lingusamy made an official statement confirming that Kamal Haasan had agreed to direct and feature in a film to be produced by the production house, Thirrupathi Brothers. The actor had handed Lingusamy three scripts with the pair chose the most commercially viable option, with the early working title of the film being Bitter Chocolate. In June 2013, the project was retitled Uttama Villain, with Kamal Haasan himself writing the script for the film, while Crazy Mohan was involved in early discussions for the film's dialogues. Eventually, Kamal Haasan wanted to do Uttama Villain as a full-fledged comedy film after the production of Vishwaroopam (2013), due to Haasan's commitments of acting in comedy films soon after he finishes an experimental film, with the controversies he faced during the release of Vishwaroopam being added as one of the factors.

Yuvan Shankar Raja was signed on to compose the film's music, after being the first choice for Haasan's Vishwaroopam, when Selvaraghavan handled the direction duties for the film. Reports also incorrectly suggested that Rajesh was added to the scripting team for the film. In July 2013, Ramesh Aravind took over the task of directing the film from Kamal Haasan, for whom the film became his directorial debut in Tamil, after previously directed films in Kannada. However, it was not being the first film; his proposed directorial debut was titled KG (2004) with Haasan which was shelved after Haasan's commitments with Mumbai Xpress (2005). In February 2014, Ghibran was announced as the film's music composer instead of Yuvan Shankar Raja. Sanu John Varghese and Mahesh Narayanan was initially reported to be the film's cinematographer and editor respectively after working with Haasan in Vishwaroopam. However, Haasan chose Shamdat Sainudeen and Vijay Shankar as the director of photography and editor of the project respectively and Gautami was selected to handle the costume designing for the film. According to Ramesh Aravind, Kamal Haasan wrote the majority of the dialogue and that Crazy Mohan's input and suggestions were recorded.

Casting 
Kamal Haasan was reported to play two roles for the film: one being a 21st-century cinema superstar named Manoranjan and an 8th-century drama actor named Uthaman. Kajal Aggarwal was initially reported to have signed on to play the lead female role, though her manager later confirmed that she was not approached and that her dates were already allotted for other projects. Similarly, Santhanam was also reported to play comedian in the film but the actor denied such claims. Asin and Deepika Padukone were also reported by the media to be cast in the lead female role, though neither reports materialised. The team later held discussions with actresses Divya Spandana and Lekha Washington for roles in the film, though neither were signed. A month prior to shoot, three female lead characters were touted to appear in the film, with the names of Kajal Aggarwal (who initially refused the film), Tamannaah and Trisha Krishnan were surfaced.

In a turn of events, the team chose Pooja Kumar and Andrea Jeremiah as the female leads, whom earlier worked with Haasan in Vishwaroopam, and Parvathy Thiruvothu was also offered for the third female lead role. Pooja played the role of a non-Tamil-speaking modern-day actress, who was offered a character that spoke classical Tamil. Pooja also performed 3 song sequences in the film, unlike in Vishwaroopam (2013), where she had no song sequences. Kamal Haasan's daughter Shruti Haasan was considered for the role of his on-screen daughter in the film but her unavailability meant that the team chose to pick a new actress instead. Another actress Parvathy Nair was added to the cast after impressing the team in an audition and was select to be paired opposite Ashwin, a debutant who plays Kamal Haasan's son in the film. Actors Sarath Kumar and Vivek were reported to have been added to the preliminary cast, but the actors later noted the news as untrue.

In January 2014, noted director K. Balachander was selected to play a pivotal role in the film and sported a beard for his character. He was reported to play Manoranjan's mentor Margadarshi, who guided him to this status of superstardom, ironically Balachander was also Haasan's real-life mentor. Producer Lingusamy himself was reported to be playing a role in the venture, after being seen sporting a new look during the making of his directorial project Anjaan (2014). Director K. Viswanath also joined the film's cast as did Jayaram, and the pair began filming scenes in March 2014. Anant Mahadevan, who featured in Vishwaroopam (2013), was given the role of the manager of Kamal Haasan's character in the film. More details about the film were shown in mid-March with a detailed cast and character list released to the media. In May 2014, actor Nassar was signed for a supporting role. In July 2014, director Chitra Lakshmanan joined the team to play a small role in the film. Actress Abhirami was selected to dub for Pooja Kumar in the film. Ramesh Aravind himself was to make a cameo appearance in the film, but the director did not reveal much about it and kept his decision under wraps. Following the death of K. Balachander, the team released the film as a homage to the late director.

Filming 
In mid-February 2014, the team carried out make up tests involving Kamal Haasan in Bangalore with a photo shoot being held with the actor. Following this, the first teaser of the film unveiled on 1 March 2014 with the title and logo design. A series of posters were also unveiled by the film's team on the following days and the principal photography began on 3 March 2014. The team then shot for two weeks in Bangalore, before moving on to film sequences in Chennai with Gautami joining the team as a costume designer. In early April, parts of the film were shot in Madhya Pradesh before the team returned to Bangalore to film scenes involving Parvathy Nair and Ashwin. Further scenes involving Kamal Haasan in the role of a star actor were filmed at a shopping mall in Bangalore, with several hundred onlookers used as extras. Posters from a fictional film in the plot, Veera Vilaiyaatu, were put up around the mall by the film's art direction team.

After initially planning a trip to Australia to film the songs from the soundtrack for a week, the team later opted to fly to Turkey instead. Many scenes in the film, including a song featuring Kamal Haasan and Pooja Kumar was consequently shot in Istanbul. The cast performed night rehearsals to perfect their expressions and dialogues. The portions featuring Kamal Haasan as an aging superstar were completed with the shoot of the song, followed by the 21st century portions which were completed by mid-May 2014. In between, Kamal Haasan took a break from the shoot to attend the 2014 Cannes Film Festival and to inaugurate the Indian Pavilion there. Another schedule was started on 21 May 2014 in Madhya Pradesh and then at a private studio in Chennai, with the team filming scenes that take place in the 8th century. Actor Nasser joined the film playing the antagonist and also has a dual role in the film. In early June 2014, Andrea had completed her portions in the film.

Kamal Haasan sustained a small muscle pull during the film's shooting and was advised a day's rest. However, he attended an award ceremony following his commitments to be a part of it and the makers released the teaser of the film on the same event. The majority of the film's portions were shot by the end of July, with only patchwork and dubbing left. A 10-minute climax sequence of the film was shot during the schedule which was touted to be a "spellbinding experience for moviegoers". On 9 August 2014, Ramesh Aravind confirmed on his Twitter account that the shooting of the film had been completed at the Chennai Film Institute with a song sequence which would feature in the 8th century segment of the film.

Music 

The soundtrack and film score was composed by Ghibran in his maiden collaboration with Kamal Haasan. Ghibran signed the project along with Haasan's Vishwaroopam II, but as the film's production was delayed, he has signed for the actor's other two projects: Papanasam and Thoongaa Vanam. Kamal Hassan bought musical instruments from Bali, Indonesia for recording songs in a mythical segment in the film because the instruments sounded both Indian and exotic and both Ghibran and Hassan wanted the music to be creative. According to Ghibran, traditional tunes were mixed with orchestral symphony backgrounds and were fused with Villu Paatu and Theyyam. Ghibran also said that he and Kamal Haasan decided to not use instruments traditionally used in period films such as tabla, ghatam and dholak. The composer further told that Kamal Hassan had sung in three songs and might sing in a few more. Ghibran had spent a year-and-a-half on the score.

The music album of Uttama Villain was released on 1 March 2015 after multiple postponements. The album which featured 17 tracks including seven themes from the score, with lyrics written by Haasan, Viveka and Subbu Arumugam, was released on a mobile application instead of conventional CDs, as a first-of-its-kind approach. The soundtrack release coincided with a promotional launch event held at Chennai Trade Centre on 1 March 2015, with prominent celebrities along with the film's cast and crew being present. The audio launch of the film took place on 29 March 2015.

The soundtrack received high critical acclaim and Ghibran won accolades for his work in the film. Siddharth K. of Sify rated it 4.5 out of 5 and wrote, "Ghibran has grown leaps and bounds with this album and has indeed delivered his career-best...If anyone has any problems in recognizing the effort that has gone into this album, they need to get their musical buds examined. Uttama Villain is an album to be cherished by film buffs and is not for the typical frontbenchers". M. Suganth of The Times of India wrote, "Uttama Villain is that rare Tamil film album which doesn't merely push the envelope but has managed to create a new, different envelope". Vipin Nair of Music Aloud gave it a score of 9 out of 10, calling it "one hell of a soundtrack". A reviewer from Behindwoods gave it 3.75 out of 5 and stated it was "one of its kind gems in Tamil cinema music". Karthik Srinivasan of Milliblog called it "one of the most daring and inventive musical attempts in recent Tamil cinema history".

== Release ==
Kamal Haasan revealed that the film would release before Vishwaroopam II, another film which featured him in the lead role. The film was initially touted to be released on 2 October 2014, coinciding with Gandhi Jayanthi, further also clashing with Hrithik Roshan-starrer Bang Bang! and Sivakarthikeyan's Kakki Sattai. However, the director Ramesh Aravind clarified that the film involved extensive visual effects work to be done and that it would be completed in 10 weeks. Then, the release of 7 November 2014, which coincides Kamal Haasan's birthday also proved to be untrue. The film was then speculated to release on 20 February 2015, following information from a popular ticket booking website. The release was later pushed to April 2015.

In February 2015, Eros International which purchased the worldwide distribution rights of the film announced that the film will be released worldwide on 2 April 2015. Thirrupathi Brothers acquired the domestic theatrical rights while Raajkamal Films International handled the distribution for the overseas theatres. Studio Green bought the Tamil Nadu theatrical rights. The release was later pushed to 10 April 2015, coinciding the five-day Tamil New Year weekend; and trade analysts believed about the increase in footfalls, following school examinations which will be completed within the same date. However, due to the delay in completion of visual effects, the producers later postponed the film to 24 April and 1 May. Then the film was scheduled to release on 1 May 2015, which was confirmed by the producers. But, it was released on 2 May after sorting out issues between financiers and producers. The entire team attended the film's premiere at the Golden Cinemas in Dubai on 30 April 2015, a day before the Indian release.

Marketing 
Before the film's production, the first look and title logo of the film were released on 1 March 2014, depicting a Theyyam art form sketched on Haasan's face and few more posters were subsequently released. Thirrupathi Brothers attached the teaser trailer for the film along with Suriya starrer Anjaan (another film produced by the studio), at the 8th Vijay Awards held on 5 July 2014, and was simultaneously uploaded to YouTube. The film's trailer was supposed to be released on Pongal, but after being unofficially leaked through the internet on 13 January 2015, the trailer was launched the next day morning by the makers. The second trailer of the film was released at the film's audio launch event on 1 March 2015, and the third trailer was unveiled on 29 March 2015. Few more trailers were released, ahead of the film's release. Shortly after the film's release, the makers unveiled six deleted scenes of the film, which was well received.

Home media 
Herotalkies.com (VS Ecommerce Ventures) legally released the film for audiences outside India in June 2015. Initially, the satellite rights were acquired by Jaya TV, but it was later sold to Zee Tamil.

Lawsuit

Plagiarism allegations 
There was speculation that the first look of the film was inspired from a photograph taken by French photographer Eric Lafforgue, but Kamal Hassan denied the allegations by saying, "Theyyam is more than a 1000-year-old art. The make-up was done by a good artist who is probably a third-generation practitioner of this art. My film has a Theyyam dance fusion with Tamil Nadu's Kooththu tradition". Admitting that the lighting might have had a few similarities to the photograph of the French photographer, he said that comparing the photo with his first look poster was like saying two lovers leaning on one another's chest looking in the same direction is a copy of the Ek Duje Ke Liye poster. He also stated that the poster did not depict a mask, but make-up painted on his face and that it took four hours to paint it.

Protests by Vishva Hindu Parishad 
Vishva Hindu Parishad's (VHP) Tamil Nadu wing called for banning the film's release, as they alleged that the lyrics of a song in the film had belittled a conversation between Prahalada and Hiranyakashipu, which offend the religious sentiments of Hindu people. They also criticised the makers for the objectionable portrayal of Lord Vishnu in a song. Furthermore, the Indian National League, a Muslim organisation also protested against the film citing that it may hurt religious sentiments.

Financial allegations 
Lingusamy sold the film's distribution rights to Eros International, in order to overcome the losses suffered by the failure of Suriya-starrer Anjaan, and Studio Green agreed to market the film in Tamil Nadu. A few days before the film's release, producer and distributor R. Thangaraj of Thangam Cinemas, filed a petition to stay the release of the film, as producer has to pay , to settle down the losses. Thirrupathi Brothers had also borrowed from various local financiers, promising them films distribution areas. The financiers were unwilling to waive a part of the loan for a smooth release. The overseas release of the film happened as the rights for the overseas territory belonged to Raaj Kamal, while the Indian theatrical rights were with Thirrupathi Brothers.

Due to the disputes between financiers and producers, the film's release date which was scheduled for 1 May 2015, has been stalled. Theatres across TN had sold tickets in advance for the opening day, but most of the shows were been cancelled, which led to outrage and dismay with the film union and producers. Kamal Haasan, after the Dubai premiere on 30 April, flew back to India late on Friday, to sort out the issue along with trade bodies like Tamil Film Producers Council and Nadigar Sangam. After the dispute was settled, the film opened in India on 2 May 2015.

Reception

Critical response 
M. Suganth, editor-in-chief of The Times of India rated the film three-and-a-half out of five, lauding it as one of the "rare films with a meta-narrative where the line between the real and the reel becomes hard to distinguish and further called it as glorious showcase for Kamal the writer as he superbly blends subtlety with slapstick and the emotional moments never descend into full-blown melodrama that turns all eyes misty throughout the film". A critic from Behindwoods also rated the film three-and-a-half out of five and felt it was an "excellent cinematic viewing experience" appreciating its "unique narrative". Siddharth K of Sify gave Uttama Villain four out of five stars and called it "a courageous film which breaks away from being a routine fare", describing it as "emotional as well as gripping". They also felt that "The sheer thrill of watching a film and not knowing what will happen next is one of the great pleasures offered by director Ramesh Aravind", summing it up as "a good example of an entertaining commercial film that didn't need to be lazy or senseless". Karthik Keramalu of IBN Live appreciated Uttama Villain majorly for three particular conversations that they placed among the best in Tamil cinema, concluding that it is "a film worthy of a eulogy speech and the grandeur is not spoilt in the name of commercialization".

S. Saraswathi of Rediff.com appreciated director Ramesh Aravind for the narrative "that skilfully alternates between fake and real which is seemingly similar situations is ingenious" and lauded the brilliance of Kamal Haasan, "the master performer for essaying two totally contrasting characters amazingly". They wrote that the film may not appeal to all due to its almost three hours length and slow screenplay, but still judged that it is "a film worth watching for stunning music and performance" and rating it three out of five. Saibal Chatterjee of NDTV lauded Uttama Villain as a "terrific take on superstardom and mortality, feeling it is a satire in parts when Manoranjan, played by Kamal Haasan comes to know that he has only a few days to live, so he decides to make a film in which he's immortal". Anupama Subramanian of Deccan Chronicle wrote that the movie lived up to expectations partially as the first half drags, but post interval picks up the momentum summing up as a Kamal show all the way, sparkling as an ego bloated Manoranjan and the simpleton Uttaman, concluding, "There are few shortcomings. Nevertheless Kamals’ amazing screen presence pulls an otherwise bit dragging film with a runtime of 2 hours and 52 minutes". Baradwaj Rangan in his review for The Hindu wrote, "Kamal Haasan's writing is so dense and allusive and overstuffed and layered and indulgent that it's always a question whether even the best actors and directors in the world can come up with the kind of wit and timing needed to fully make the transition from page to screen — in other words, the best Kamal Haasan movies are probably locked up inside his head, where they reside in the most perfect possible manner. But with some of the lightweight cast and crew, he's been working with of late, this material doesn't stand a chance".

Box office
A delay of one-and-a-half day in release affected the collections in India. The film collected  in United States in three days. In Kerala, the film had a slow start collecting only  from two days.

The film's poor performance led Thirrupathi Brothers to a large financial tangle.

Awards and nominations

Notes

References

External links
 
 

2015 films
2010s dance films
Films about actors
2015 comedy-drama films
Indian dance films
2010s Tamil-language films
Films with screenplays by Kamal Haasan
Films scored by Mohamaad Ghibran
Indian comedy-drama films
Films shot in Bangalore
Films shot in Chennai
Films shot in Madhya Pradesh
Films shot in Istanbul
Indian nonlinear narrative films
2015 comedy films